Farol da Ponta do Sinó is a lighthouse near Ponta do Sinó, the southernmost point of the island of Sal, Cape Verde. It is around 2 km southwest of the center of Santa Maria. The tower is quadrangular and is 9 meters tall and is made out of concrete, it has an outer staircase and features a lantern.  All of the exterior are painted in white. The lighthouse was built in 1892. In early 2013, a second building with the same style was constructed and was finished before 2014 and became activated as the lighthouse moved to its new location.

See also
List of lighthouses in Cape Verde
List of buildings and structures in Cape Verde

References

External links

Ponta Sino
Ponta Sino
Lighthouses completed in 1892
1890s establishments in Cape Verde